Stéphane Houdet defeated Alfie Hewett in the final, 6–2, 4–6, 6–3 to win the men's singles wheelchair tennis title at the 2017 US Open.

Shingo Kunieda was the two-time defending champion from when the event was last held in 2015, but was defeated by Hewett in the quarterfinals.

There was no edition of the event in 2016 due to a scheduling conflict with the 2016 Summer Paralympics.

Seeds

Draw

Bracket

External links 

 Draw

Wheelchair Men's Singles
U.S. Open, 2017 Men's Singles